The 1960 Campeonato Profesional was the 13th season of Colombia's top-flight football league. 12 teams competed against one another and played each weekend. Santa Fe won the league for the 3rd time in its history after getting 61 points. Millonarios, the defending champion, was 6th with 45 points.

Background
The same 12 teams from the last tournament competed in this one. Santa Fe won the championship for the third time.

League system
Every team played four games against each other team, two at home and two away. Teams received two points for a win and one point for a draw. If two or more teams were tied on points, places were determined by goal difference. The team with the most points is the champion of the league.

Teams

Final standings

Results

First turn

Second turn

Top goalscorers

Source: RSSSF.com Colombia 1960

References

External links 
Dimayor Official Page

Campeonato Profesional
Colombia
Categoría Primera A seasons